Siyahu (also Romanized as Sīyāhū) is a village in Siyahu Rural District, Siyahu District, Bandar Abbas County, Hormozgan Province, Iran. At the 2006 census, its population was 934, in 244 families.

References 

Populated places in Bandar Abbas County